The 2021 Orix Buffaloes season was the 85th season of the franchise in Nippon Professional Baseball, their 17th season after their merger with the Osaka Kintetsu Buffaloes, and also their 17th season in Kyocera Dome Osaka. It was the Buffaloes' first season under new manager Satoshi Nakajima. For the first time since 1996 (or 2001 if one counts the history with the Kintetsu Buffaloes), the Buffaloes made the Japan Series, but lost to the Tokyo Yakult Swallows in 6 games.

Regular season 
After finishing in last place 2 years in a row, the Buffaloes managed to turn things around, going 70-55-18 for a .584 winning percentage. The Buffaloes also were the best at interleague, at 12-5-1, for a .761 win percentage in interleague.

Pacific League standings

References 

Orix Buffaloes seasons
2021 Nippon Professional Baseball season